The Gulmarg Wildlife Sanctuary spread over  is a protected area in Gulmarg, Baramulla district of Jammu and Kashmir, India. The sanctuary lies on the north-eastern side of the Pir Panjal mountain range and falls under the northwest Biogeographic Zone 2A. The sanctuary was first declared as a game reserve in 1981 and later upgraded to a sanctuary in 1987.

Geography
The Gulmarg Wildlife Sanctuary lies in the Pir Panjal Range of the Western Himalayas. It is surrounded by the forests of the Gulmarg basin and the upper catchment area of the Ferozpur stream. The sanctuary is bordered by the forest divisions of Jehlum Valley to the north and west, Poonch and Pir Panjal to the south and the Drang village to the east. The highly steep terrain of the upper reaches of Ferozpur gorge consists of Panjal volcanics, with exposed acidic lava flows. Limestone, shale, quartzite and slate occur throughout the sanctuary. The Gulmarg Wildlife Sanctuary has a temperate climate. Snowfall during the winter amounts most part of the precipitation.

Flora and fauna
The vegetation of the Gulmarg Wildlife Sanctuary mainly consists of sub-alpine forests of silver fir (Abies pindrow), silver birch (Betula utilis) and blue pine. Silver fir is restricted to moist aspects and is associated with Pinus griffithii, Taxus wallichiana and Picea smithiana at lower altitudes. At lower altitudes, Pinus griffithi are predominant in the blue pine forests that surround the Gulmarg resort. They are mixed with spruce – Picea smithiana, maple – Acer cappadocicum and yew – Taxus wallichiana. The alpine meadows are dominated by the herbaceous flora of different species. These include Corydalis, Inula, Potentilla, Primula, Gentiana, Rumex and Iris. Daffodils and jonquils of the genus Narcissus, which were introduced have become naturalized. The sanctuary has also valuable resources of medicinal plants such as Saussurea costus (Jogi badshah), Picrorhiza kurroa and Jurinea dolomiaea.

The Gulmarg Wildlife Sanctuary has a recorded 95 bird species of different families including Kashmir flycatcher (Ficedula subrubra), Himalayan snowcock (Tetraogallus himalayensis), Impeyan monal (Lophophorus impejanus) and Koklass pheasant (Pucrasia macrolopha). There are 31 butterfly species reported from the sanctuary.

The Gulmarg Wildlife Sanctuary is noted for its wildlife. The mammals found in the sanctuary include Himalayan brown bear (Ursus arctos), Asiatic black bear (Ursus thibetanus), Leopard (Panthera pardus), Musk deer (Moschus crysogaster), Kashmir grey langur (Semnopithecus ajax), Snow leopard (Uncia), Tibetan wolf (Canis lupus), Red fox (Vulpes), Leopard cat (Prionailurus bengalensis), Jungle cat (Felis chaus) and Yellow-throated marten (Martes flavigula). The sanctuary acts as a natural corridor in the movement of brown bear and markhor between Poonch and the Kashmir Valley forests.

See also
 Dachigam National Park
 Hirpora Wildlife Sanctuary
 Overa-Aru Wildlife Sanctuary

References 

National parks in Jammu and Kashmir
Tourist attractions in Baramulla district
1987 establishments in Jammu and Kashmir
Protected areas established in 1987